Tomislav Mikulić (born 4 January 1982 in Vukovar) is a retired Croatian football player who played as a defender.

Club career
Mikulić started his career with Croatia's NK Osijek before moving to K.R.C. Genk in 2005. On 18 December 2007 he signed a -year deal with Dinamo Zagreb. He returned to Belgium in summer 2008 when he signed with Standard de Liège. In January 2013, he joined OH Leuven from Beerschot.

International career
Mikulić has previously been a part of the Croatian national under-21 football team, but has never been capped with the seniors.

Honours
 Standard Liège
 Belgian First Division A: 2008–09
 Belgian Super Cup: 2008, 2009

References

Guardian Football

External links
 

1982 births
Living people
Sportspeople from Vukovar
Association football defenders
Croatian footballers
Croatia youth international footballers
Croatia under-21 international footballers
NK Osijek players
K.R.C. Genk players
GNK Dinamo Zagreb players
Standard Liège players
Beerschot A.C. players
Oud-Heverlee Leuven players
Panthrakikos F.C. players
MKS Cracovia (football) players
NK Slaven Belupo players
HNK Gorica players
Croatian Football League players
Belgian Pro League players
Super League Greece players
Ekstraklasa players
First Football League (Croatia) players
Croatian expatriate footballers
Expatriate footballers in Belgium
Expatriate footballers in Greece
Expatriate footballers in Poland
Croatian expatriate sportspeople in Belgium
Croatian expatriate sportspeople in Greece
Croatian expatriate sportspeople in Poland